Kosmos 348 ( meaning Cosmos 348), also known as DS-U2-GK No.2, was a Soviet satellite which was launched in 1970 as part of the Dnepropetrovsk Sputnik programme. It was a  spacecraft, which was built by the Yuzhnoye Design Bureau, and was used to study the density of air in the upper atmosphere, and investigate aurorae.

Launch 
A Kosmos-2I 63SM carrier rocket was used to launch Kosmos 348 into low Earth orbit. The launch took place from Site 133/1 at the Plesetsk Cosmodrome, with liftoff occurring at 04:59:57 UTC on 13 June 1970. Kosmos 348 was successfully inserted into orbit. Upon reaching orbit, the satellite was assigned its Kosmos designation, and received the International Designator 1970-044A. The North American Aerospace Defense Command assigned it the catalogue number 04413.

Orbit 
Kosmos 348 was the second of two DS-U2-GK satellites to be launched. It decayed from orbit within a few weeks of its launch, reentering the atmosphere on 25 July 1970.

References

Kosmos satellites
Spacecraft launched in 1970
1970 in the Soviet Union
Dnepropetrovsk Sputnik program